Kangilinnguit or Kangilínguit, formerly Grønnedal , is a settlement and location of a former naval base in Greenland's Sermersooq municipality, located at the mouth of Arsuk Fjord in southwestern Greenland. The settlement had 160 inhabitants in 2010, most of whom are Danish Navy personnel, attached to Island Command Greenland headquarters.

For the former U.S. Naval Operating Facility there, see Bluie West Seven.

History 
Kangilinnguit was founded as "Green Valley" by the United States Navy during the Second World War to protect the highly strategic cryolite quarry in the former settlement of Ivittuut. The U.S. Navy turned the base over to the Danish Navy in August 1951. During the early years of the Cold War, the base was used by anti-submarine warfare ships of NATO, which tracked Soviet Navy submarines in the North Atlantic.

Since at least the mid-1990s, the Danish Navy has proposed saving money on the headquarters staff of Island Command Greenland out of isolated Grønnedal by relocating most of the 65 members either to the Greenlandic capital at Nuuk or bringing them back to Aarhus in Jutland. However, the Greenlandic government has successfully lobbied to keep the command intact in order to boost the local economy.

Under the terms of the "2010-2014 Danish Defense Agreement" approved by the Danish parliament on 24 June 2009, the Greenland Command absorbed the (nearly defunct) Faroe Island Command. The combined command was placed in Nuuk under the name of "Arctic Command". As a result, in 2012, Kangilinnguit was closed and residual military functions moved to Nuuk (Godthaab), the capital of Greenland.

Population

References

External links
 Website of the Greenland Command at Kangilinnguit 
 arsukfjorden.gl − local web site with maps 

Heliports in Greenland
Populated places in Greenland